Plouharnel is a commune in the Morbihan department of Brittany in north-western France. Inhabitants of Plouharnel are called in French Plouharnelais.

Geography

The commune is border by Atlantic ocean except to the north and the east. The northern part of the  isthmus connecting the mainland to the ancient island of Quiberon is located in the commune's southern part.

Map

Transports

There are two railway stations in the commune of Plouharnel, both on the Auray–Quiberon railway which is operated in summer only: Plouharnel-Carnac and Les Sables-Blancs. At Auray station connections to Paris and other places in France are offered.

Monuments

The commune contains a number of megalithic monuments including those at Le Vieux-Moulin, comprising six stones weighing up to ten tons.

See also
Communes of the Morbihan department

References

External links

Official website 

 Mayors of Morbihan Association 

Communes of Morbihan